Lična karta or lichna karta (Cyrillic: Лична карта) is a South Slavic (Serbian, Bosnian, Montenegrin, Macedonian and Bulgarian) term literally meaning personal card and may refer to the national identity cards of any of the following countries and territories:
 - see Serbian identity card
 - see Bosnian-Herzegovinian identity card (also called Osobna iskaznica in Croatian)
 - see Montenegrin identity card
 - see Macedonian identity card
 - see Bulgarian identity card
 - see Kosovo identity card (also called Letërnjoftim in Albanian)